The New Zealand cricket team is scheduled to tour England in August and September 2023 to play four One Day International (ODI) and four Twenty20 International (T20I) matches.

Squads

Tour matches

T20I Series

1st T20I

2nd T20I

3rd T20I

4th T20I

ODI Series

1st ODI

2nd ODI

3rd ODI

4th ODI

References

External links
 Series home at ESPNcricinfo

2023 in English cricket
2023 in New Zealand cricket
International cricket competitions in 2023